Eldar Mamedov is the name of:
 Eldar R. Mamedov (born 1990), Russian football player
 Eldar Mammadov (born 1968), Azerbaijani military figure